Suzy George is an American attorney and foreign policy advisor who was selected to serve as the Chief of Staff to the United States Secretary of State in the Biden administration.

Education 
George earned a Bachelor of Arts degree from Mount Holyoke College and a Juris Doctor from the George Washington University Law School.

Career 
From 1990 to 1993, George worked for the National Democratic Institute. From 1995 to 1997, she served as a special assistant and assistant counsel in the Office of the Ambassador of the United States to the United Nations. From 1997 to 2001, George was deputy chief of staff to the United States Secretary of State. George also worked in foreign policy and national security roles in the Obama administration, including chief of staff of the Directorate of Operations.

References 

Living people
Year of birth missing (living people)

Mount Holyoke College alumni
George Washington University Law School alumni
United States Department of State officials
Obama administration personnel
Biden administration personnel